Schneer is a surname. Notable people with the surname include:
 Charles H. Schneer (1920–2009), American film producer
 Jonathan Schneer (born 1948), American historian

See also 
 Schneier
 Schneersohn